The Vetch Field was a football stadium in Swansea, Wales. It was used for football matches and was the home ground of Swansea City until the club moved to the newly built Liberty Stadium in 2005. Opened in 1912, the ground held around 12,000 at the time of its closure, but upwards of 30,000 at its peak.

As well as being home to the Swans, the Vetch also hosted games for the Wales national football team, with 18 internationals played at the Vetch between 1921 and 1988. Other sports also found a home at the Vetch, with 8 rugby league matches played there between 1990 and 1999. In 1960, local boy Brian Curvis beat the Australian boxer George Barnes at the Vetch to win the Commonwealth (British Empire) Welterweight title.

The stadium also operated as a music venue, hosting The Who in 1976 and Stevie Wonder in 1984.

The Vetch's final Football League fixture was a 1–0 win for Swansea over Shrewsbury Town on 30 April 2005. The last game of football to be held at the Vetch was the 2005 FAW Premier Cup final, which saw Swansea beat Wrexham 2–1.

The Vetch continues to be the subject of much nostalgia amongst some Swansea fans, who often feel that it had a more vibrant and authentic atmosphere than the Liberty Stadium.

History

Named due to the vetch (a type of legume – not a cabbage as popularly misbelieved in most of south Wales) that was grown on its surface at the time, the site was owned by Swansea Gaslight Company in 1912, when a professional football team was formed in the town. The site was in a good location and deemed surplus to requirements at the Gas Company, so the club moved in. Originally, the surface was made of compacted coal cinder and players had to wear knee pads for the first season of football there. Having seen many changes during its 93 years (detailed below), the Vetch took its final bow with an FAW Premier Cup Final against Wrexham. After the game, the seats, turf, advertising hoardings and anything else fans could get their hands on were removed from the ground, and is currently in the process of being demolished as the council seek permission to build on the land there, the entrances have been boarded up and the turf of the pitch has been taken up. The 2004–05 season was the first time in 93 years that the Vetch had the highest average attendance in its division.

On 30 April 2005, Adrian Forbes scored the last league goal at the Vetch in Swansea's 1–0 win over Shrewsbury Town. The player who scored the final goal at the Vetch was Andy Robinson, who scored the winner in a 2–1 victory over Wrexham.

Stands

The Centre (South) Stand
Originally built in 1912 to house 1,500 spectators, the Centre Stand went through numerous changes before ending up as a stand that ran only 3/4 the length of the pitch, with a family stand at one end, and some wooden bench seating at the other. It was suggested that the gable and clock be moved to the Liberty Stadium, however as yet nothing has transpired.

The West Terrace

Also the 'Away' stand, it was a single tier terrace and held about 2,000. It was originally a double-decker stand, with seating above the remaining terrace, however the upper tier was first closed and then built over during the late 1980s, and early 1990s amid growing safety concerns. The stairs to the upper tier are still visible from the lower. In 2005, the stand was split to accommodate both home and away fans. The stadium had a fairly unusual feature only found at Wembley as well, which was an underpass that allowed pedestrians to walk under the pitch.

The North Bank
Originally just a mound of earth with some concrete and railway sleepers on top of it, the 'big bank' grew to be the largest area of the ground. During the late 1950s the supporters' trust paid for a roof to be installed, and during the 1970s, and 1980s the Bank became home to the majority of supporters, and the most vocal. Safety concerns reduced its capacity by blocking off a large section at the rear, and following the Hillsborough disaster its safety certificate was again cut, and by the early 21st century it held around 3,500 due to concerns about the front not being covered. The number it could safely hold was increased towards the end of its life, ensuring that the North Bank was filled to capacity for the majority of matches during the final season.

The East Stand
The East Terrace was originally another mound of earth with some railway sleepers, and remained so until the late 1970s, when the club began its rise through the divisions. It became the first area of the ground to be redeveloped, and half the length of the pitch at the 'Town' end of the ground became home to the East Stand. A small layer of steep terracing lay beneath a stand with a capacity of around 2,500. It was also home to one of the most bizarre floodlights in the league, jutting out over the stand, completely out of character with the rest of the ground. Due to the refusal of residents of William Street behind the stand it could not be extended further, and financial problems ensured that it was the only part of the ground to be redeveloped, although further developments were initially planned.

Redevelopment
On 23 May 2009, the ground was put onto the market after being replaced by the Liberty Stadium almost four years earlier.

Plans were originally made to build a community centre and housing development on the Vetch Field site but had not been put through. This includes a 120-unit housing development and a play area. The housing development would include two, three and four-storey homes. The streets would also be organised into safe but accessible "home zones" designed along communities in the Netherlands where vehicle speeds would be restricted. Parts of the Vetch Field could also be included in the overall development in a public display, planned for what was the centre spot of the old stadium.

Swansea Council also hoped tenders would be received for the development works by autumn 2009 and a preferred developer to be chosen by the start of the following year. Meanwhile, items of memorabilia at the Vetch Field, such as the stadium clock, have been transferred to Swansea Museum.

Demolition
Demolition work on the ground began on 31 January 2011. The work was predicted to last four to six months. The famous North Bank was the first stand to be pulled down.

Initially there was some controversy as to the whereabouts of the centre stand's clock – on arrival, the contractors noticed it was missing. It was later confirmed in the South Wales Evening Post that it was in the safe hands of a group of people angered by the council's neglect of such Vetch relics as the clock.

As of May 2011 no full stands remain and all the floodlights have been removed, including the East Stand's unique, bizarre floodlight. By the beginning of June 2011, with the club promoted to the Premier League and passing what's left of the ground on a victory parade, work has begun on the outside walls of the old stadium.

The centre circle, however, will remain, as this is where people's ashes have been spread.

In August 2011 it was confirmed by Swansea Council that the Vetch would be used temporarily for allotments. Coordinated by local artist Owen Griffiths on the historic site of the Vetch Football field, an urban utopia is being created on the site, in collaboration with the local residents.

Other uses

Wales national football team

The venue hosted eighteen Wales internationals. The results were as follows;

Wales' record at the Vetch is as follows:

Rugby League venue
On 19 August 1990 it hosted a Rugby League Charity Shield between Widnes and Wigan with Widnes winning 24 – 8.

The venue hosted six Wales internationals. The results were as follows;

On 26 July 1998 it hosted a Super League III match between St. Helens and Wigan Warriors with Wigan winning 36 – 2.

Records 

The highest attendance recorded at the Vetch Field was 32,796 for a fourth Round FA Cup match between Swansea Town and Arsenal FC on 17 February 1968.
The highest recorded attendance for a league match at the Vetch Field was 29,447 in a game against Leeds United on 1 October 1955.
The lowest recorded attendance for a league match at the Vetch Field was 1,311 in a match against Brentford on 26 April 1976.

The greatest total attendance at the Vetch was 469,814 - which occurred in the 1948/49 season when Swansea Town maintained an undefeated home league record (20 wins, 1 draw and 0 defeats) and became Champions of the Football League Third Division (South).

Pre-War, Swansea's highest average attendance was 16,118 during the season 1925/26.
Post-War, Swansea's highest average attendance was 22,535 during the 1948/49 season.
The lowest average attendance at the Vetch came in the 1974–75 season, when an average of 2,052 spectators watched each game.
The average attendance for that last season at the Vetch was 8,457.

The first floodlit match at the Vetch came in a 'Friendly' against Hibernian FC in 1960/61.
The last floodlit match occurred against Oxford United on 15 April 2005.

The first league match at the Vetch was against Cardiff City on 7 September 1912.
The last league match at the Vetch was against Shrewsbury Town on 30 April 2005.
The first Cup game at the Vetch was a Welsh Cup match against Milford on 31 October 1912.
The last Cup game at the Vetch was a FAW Premier Cup Final against Wrexham.

See also
Liberty Stadium

References

Bibliography

External links

Swansea City A.F.C official website
Images tagged Swansea City Vetch Field at Flickr
Swans legend Alan Curtis pays last Vetch visit for BBC Sport

Buildings and structures in Swansea
Buildings and structures demolished in 2011
Defunct football venues in Wales
Welsh Cup final venues
Swansea City A.F.C.
Rugby League World Cup stadiums
Multi-purpose stadiums in the United Kingdom
Sports venues completed in 1912
Sports venues demolished in 2011
English Football League venues
1912 establishments in Wales
Demolished sports venues in the United Kingdom